Lock-up provision is a term used in corporate finance which refers to the option granted by a seller to a buyer to purchase a target company’s stock as a prelude to a takeover. The major or controlling shareholder is then effectively "locked-up" and is not free to sell the stock to a party other than the designated party (potential buyer). 

Typically, a lockup agreement is required by an acquirer before making a bid and facilitates negotiation progress. Lock-ups can be “soft” (shareholder permitted to terminate if superior offer comes along) or “hard” (unconditional).

Types of lock-up arrangements

These provisions may take the form of 
(i) break-up/termination fees, 
(ii) options given to target shareholders to buy target stock, 
(iii) rights given to bidder shareholders to purchase target assets, 
(iv) force the vote provisions in merger agreements, and 
(v) agreements with major shareholders (voting agreements, agreements to sell shares or agreements to tender).

In a stock lock-up, the bidder is able to either purchase 1) authorized but unissued shares of the major or controlling stockholder, or 2) the shares of one or more large stockholders. The acquirer holds the option to exercise the shares at a higher price in the event of sale to a higher bidder, or to vote in favor of the acquirer’s bid.

An asset lock-up occurs when the target firm grants an option for the acquisition of an asset.  This is also known as a crown jewel lock-up.

Legal system vs. lock-up provisions
In many cases, lock-up provisions may impede “free competition”, and thereby restrict the market from acting naturally by preventing rival bids for the target company.  

Courts will approve lockups if they find that the lockup was used to encourage a bidder to make an offer and not as a device to end an auction or bidding process. Asset lock-ups, however, discourage other bidders, and are generally discouraged by the courts.

See also
 Poison pill
 Mergers and acquisitions
 Microeconomics
 Industrial organization

Mergers and acquisitions